Premium Night: Love & Songs (stylized as Koda Kumi Premium Night ~Love & Songs~) is the eleventh live DVD by Japanese singer-songwriter Koda Kumi. It's a video footage of a concert which was held in Nippon Budoukan for celebrate Koda's 30th birthday. It's her first concert after giving birth.

It was released in 2 DVDs and Blu-ray format. Rental live CD was also released on the same day as well as 5 other live CDs with her previous concert. Driving Hit's 5 was also released on the same day.

Track list
Official Track list.
DVD1
 "Opening Movie"
 "Ai no Kotoba"
 "show girl"
 "Butterfly"
 "Gentle Words"
 "Taisetsu na Kimi e / anytime / Promise / Suki de, suki de, suki de / flower"
 "Crazy 4 U"
 "Dance Part"
 "1000 no Kotoba"
 "hands"
 "you"
 "Rain"
 "Pearl Moon"
 "Ai no Uta"
 "Anata Dake Ga / Unmei / come back / Brave"
 "Moon Crying"
 "Someday"
 "DJ Part"
 "Pop Diva (Remix)"
 "Taboo (Remix)"
 "Universe"
 "Go to the top"
 "Take Back"
 "All for You"
 "walk ~to the future~"
 "Comes Up"
 "Lady Go!"
DVD2
 "Making Footage"
 "Encore: Koishikute" (Bonus Footage)
 "Surprise Footage" (Bonus Footage)

References

2013 video albums
Koda Kumi video albums
Live video albums
Albums recorded at the Nippon Budokan